A Night in Terror Tower is the twenty-seventh book in the original Goosebumps, the series of children's horror fiction novels created and authored by R. L. Stine. It was adapted into a two-part episode, an audiobook, and a board game. The plot is loosely based on the historical Princes in the Tower.

Plot
Sue and her younger brother Eddie are American tourists in London. After Eddie wants to visit Terror Tower, they join a tour of the castle. As the tour progresses, Sue notices that a man wearing black is following them as they move throughout the castle. The man in black, who also wears a cape, chases them and the children manage to escape. After going back to their hotel room, they find out that the suite is empty and that their parents are not in the hotel. They have trouble remembering their last name as well. After they leave the hotel's restaurant, the man in black blocks their path, and sends them to Medieval times with magical stones.

Confused, alone, and frightened, Eddie and Sue are once again stalked by the man in black and eventually find refuge in the home of a peasant woman who promises to keep them safe. However, this turns out to be a ruse, as the woman quickly betrays them and turns them over to the man in black, who is revealed to be the Lord High Executioner of the reigning British Monarch. Sue and Eddie are then taken back to Terror Tower to await execution. 

In the dungeon, the children meet Morgred, a sorcerer, who informs them that they are Edward and Susannah, Prince and Princess of York, heir to the throne, and niece and nephew to the current King. It is revealed that the King murdered their parents—the rightful King and Queen—to claim the throne for himself, and was attempting to murder the children in order to forestall any challenge to his rule. However, before he could succeed, Morgred sent the children into a distant future with new memories in hopes of saving them from their uncle. However, he was unable to complete their new memories, resulting in them forgetting their parents and their own surnames.

Fully aware of their identity, Sue and Eddie, along with Morgred, are led to their execution. After a brief standoff with the Lord High Executioner, the children manage to break free and recover the magic stones, allowing Morgred to, once again, send them into the future. Now in the present, they are part of their tour group again. A bearded man, Morgred, joins the children as their guardian and tells them to call him Mr. Morgan.

Adaptations
The book was adapted into a two-part episode for the television series. Jeffrey Kauffman, of DVD Talk, wrote, "If you're new to the Goosebumps world, this is a great place to start, with two exceptional episodes which perfectly balance thrills with an at times black humor".

An audiobook was released by Walt Disney Records, which was nominated for an Audie Award for "Best Audio Children's Production". In a review of the audiobook, Billboard said that it is an "imaginative, intriguing tale of two American tourists who visit Terror Tower".

It was adapted into a board game titled Goosebumps: A Night in Terror Tower Game, released by the Milton Bradley Company.

Artist Tim Jacobus stated in his autobiography It Came From New Jersey! My Life As An Artist that the cover was one of the hardest pieces of art he ever had to draw and the longest to finish.

A spin-off and sequel appears in the Give yourself Goosebumps series where the protagonists from the first book returns to take down their evil uncle Robert once and for all.

Sales
A 2001 article from Publishers Weekly said that the book was 294 on the list of bestselling children's books of all time, with 1,316,723 copies sold since its original publication.

Home media
The VHS release included a bookmark. The episodes were released on DVD in 2008, with no special features. The DVD also includes the two-part episode Stay Out of the Basement.

See also
Tower of London in popular culture

References

Goosebumps
1995 American novels
1995 fantasy novels
1990s horror novels
American horror novels
American fantasy novels
1995 children's books
Novels about time travel
Novels set in London
Works set in castles
American novels adapted into television shows
Scholastic Corporation books